Sarosesthes fulminans is a species of beetle in the family Cerambycidae, the only species in the genus Sarosesthes.

References

Clytini